Athleta is a Brazilian-origin Japanese sports equipment brand focused on association football products. The firm manufactures and supplies kit uniforms, balls, and boots.

Athleta was notable for being the brand to supply Brazil national football team the first (now traditional) yellow and green shirts after the team abandoned the white and blue shirt following the Maracanazo in 1950.

History 
The brand was created in Belém, city of S. Paulo, Brazil in 1935 by the company Santa Isabel Textile Manufacturing, founded by Antônio de Oliveira. The brand "Athleta" was chosen by the company to identify its sporting goods. In the beginning, it manufactured socks and shirts for amateur sports.

In 1954, Athleta became shirt supplier to the Brazil national team, sharing duties with British company Umbro since 1958. Athleta (and Umbro itself) were both manufacturers of Brazil jerseys for the 1958, 1962, and 1970 FIFA World Cups. The production was practically artisanal: the sketches were made by hand on sheets of sulfite and the numbers embroidered in dots. Apart from the national team, Athleta was the brand for several Brazilian clubs including Santos between the 1950s and the 1980s.

In September 2009 the brand reappeared in the market by the Japanese group "The Brand's Company" (TBC), a company specialized in the direction, introduction and development of brands. The resumption of the brand began with the project “The Champions' Shirt”, a limited edition of 1,000 copies of the 31 models used by players in the 1958, 1962 and 1970 World Cups. TBC announced that all proceeds would be donated to the Association of World Champions of Brazil, whose objective was to guarantee a dignified future for athletes who have already played for the national team.

Sponsorships 
The following list that are sponsored by Athleta:

Association Football

Clubs teams 

  São Bento
  Blaublitz Akita 
  FC Maruyasu Okazaki
  Kamatamare Sanuki 
  Kochi United SC
  Nippon TV Tokyo Verdy Beleza
  Orca Kamogawa FC
  Suzuka Point Getters
  Tochigi SC 
  Tokyo Verdy

Athletes 

  Leonardo Souza
  Noriyoshi Sakai
  Junki Koike
  Keisuke Oyama
  Keigo Numata
  Keisuke Fukaya
  Ozu Moreira
  Takumi Uesato
  Teppei Yachida
  Ryota Kajikawa
  Sho Omori
  Yuji Senuma

Futsal

Club teams

  Deução Kobe
  Pescadola Machida
  Vasagey Oita

Athletes 

  Leonardo Silva
  Jonathan Araujo
   Guilherme Kuromoto
   Marcos Honda
  Ken Hinenoya
  Yuhki Kanayama
  Ito Keita
  Gensuke Mori
  Ryoto Kai
  Yudai Takahashi
  Yuta Kokado
  Takumi Nagasawa
  Kentarō Ishida
  Yuto Nishimura
  Keigo Shibayama
  Mitsuru Nakamura
  Yusei Arai
  Shota Horigome
  Yuta Kimura 
  Hyuga Saito
  Shuto Nakata
  Yuta Tsutsumi
  Yuki Nochimura
  Yukari Miyahara
  Kaho Ito
  Sara Oino
  Arthur Guilherme

Past Sponsorships

Association football

Associations
  FPF

National Teams
  (1954–1977)

Club teams

  Botafogo (1957–1969)
  Cruzeiro
  Fluminense
  Flamengo (1970–79)
  Grêmio
  Internacional
  Juventus
  São Paulo (1960–67)
  Santos (1956–1979)
  Palmeiras (1960–67)
  Portuguesa
  Vasco da Gama (1963–1978)
  Avispa Fukuoka (2015–17)
  Okayama Yunogo Belle (2018–2020)
  Vanraure Hachinohe (2015–2020)
  Cosmos (1977–78)

Athlets

  Pelé
  Félix
  Jairzinho
  Rivelino
  Tostão

Futsal

Club teams
  Magnus (2016-2021)

References

External links
 

Sporting goods manufacturers of Brazil
Sportswear brands
Brazilian brands
Clothing companies of Japan
Sporting goods manufacturers of Japan
Japanese brands
Athletic shoe brands
Clothing companies established in 1935
Sporting goods brands
1935 establishments in Brazil
1935 establishments in Japan